A  washing machine (laundry machine, clothes washer, washer, or simply wash) is a home appliance used to wash laundry. The term is mostly applied to machines that use water as opposed to dry cleaning (which uses alternative cleaning fluids and is performed by specialist businesses) or ultrasonic cleaners. The user adds laundry detergent, which is sold in liquid or powder form, to the wash water.

History

Washing by hand

Laundering by hand involves soaking, beating, scrubbing, and rinsing dirty textiles. Before indoor plumbing, individuals also had to carry all the water used for washing, boiling, and rinsing the laundry from a pump, well, or spring. Water for the laundry would be hand carried, heated on a fire for washing, then poured into the tub. That made the warm soapy water precious; it would be reused, first to wash the least soiled clothing, then to wash progressively dirtier laundry.

Removal of soap and water from the clothing after washing was a separate process. First, soap would be rinsed out with clear water. After rinsing, the soaking wet clothing would be formed into a roll and twisted by hand to extract water. The entire process often occupied an entire day of hard work, plus drying and ironing.

Nearly five billion of the world's population of seven billion as of 2010 still hand-wash their clothes.

Early machines

An early example of washing by machine is the practice of fulling. In a fulling mill, the cloth was beaten with wooden hammers, known as fulling stocks or fulling hammers.

The first English patent under the category of washing machines was issued in 1691. A drawing of an early washing machine appeared in the January 1752 issue of The Gentleman's Magazine, a British publication. Jacob Christian Schäffer's washing machine design was published in 1767 in Germany. In 1782, Henry Sidgier issued a British patent for a rotating drum washer, and in the 1790s, Edward Beetham sold numerous "patent washing mills" in England. One of the first innovations in washing machine technology was the use of enclosed containers or basins that had grooves, fingers, or paddles to help with the scrubbing and rubbing of the clothes. The person using the washer would use a stick to press and rotate the clothes along the textured sides of the basin or container, agitating the clothes to remove dirt and mud. This crude agitator technology was hand-powered, but still more effective than actually hand-washing the clothes.

More advancements were made to washing machine technology in the form of the rotative drum design. These early design patents consisted of a drum washer that was hand-cranked to make the wooden drums rotate. While the technology was simple enough, it was a milestone in the history of washing machines, as it introduced the idea of "powered" washing drums. As metal drums started to replace the traditional wooden drums, it allowed for the drum to turn above an open fire or an enclosed fire chamber, raising the water temperature for more effective washes.

It would not be until the 19th century that steam power would be used in washing machine designs.

In 1862, a patented "compound rotary washing machine, with rollers for wringing or mangling" by Richard Lansdale of Pendleton, Manchester, was shown at the 1862 London Exhibition.

The first United States Patent, titled "Clothes Washing," was granted to Nathaniel Briggs of New Hampshire in 1797. Because of the Patent Office fire in 1836, no description of the device survives. The invention of the washing machine is also attributed to Watervliet Shaker Village, as a patent was issued to an Amos Larcom of Watervliet, New York, in 1829, but it is not certain that Larcom was a Shaker. A device that combined a washing machine with a wringer mechanism did not appear until 1843 when Canadian John E. Turnbull of Saint John, New Brunswick patented a "Clothes Washer With Wringer Rolls." During the 1850s, Nicholas Bennett of the Mount Lebanon Shaker Society at New Lebanon, New York, invented a "wash mill", but in 1858 he assigned the patent to David Parker of the Canterbury Shaker Village, where it was registered as the "Improved Washing Machine".

Margaret Colvin improved the Triumph Rotary Washer, which was exhibited in the Women's Pavilion at the Centennial International Exhibition of 1876 in Philadelphia. At the same Exhibition, the Shakers won a gold medal for their machine.

Electric washing machines were advertised and discussed in newspapers as early as 1904. Alva J. Fisher has been incorrectly credited with the invention of the electric washer. The US Patent Office shows at least one patent issued before Fisher's US patent number 966677 (e.g. Woodrow's US patent number 921195). The "inventor" of the electric washing machine remains unknown.

US electric washing machine sales reached 913,000 units in 1928. However, high unemployment rates in the Depression years reduced sales; by 1932 the number of units shipped was down to about 600,000.

It is presumed that the first laundromat in the United States opened in Fort Worth, Texas, in 1934.  It was run by Andrew Klein. Patrons used coin-in-the-slot facilities to rent washing machines. The term "laundromat" can be found in newspapers as early as 1884 and they were widespread during the Depression. England established public washrooms for laundry along with bathhouses throughout the 19th century.

Washer design improved during the 1930s. The mechanism was now enclosed within a cabinet, and more attention was paid to electrical and mechanical safety. Spin dryers were introduced to replace the dangerous power mangle/wringers of the day.

By 1940, 60% of the 25,000,000 wired homes in the United States had an electric washing machine. Many of these machines featured a power wringer, although built-in spin dryers were not uncommon.

Automatic machines

Bendix Home Appliances, a subsidiary of Avco, introduced the first domestic automatic washing machine in 1937, having applied for a patent in the same year. Avco had licensed the name from Bendix Corporation, an otherwise unrelated company. In appearance and mechanical detail, this first machine was not unlike the front-loading automatic washers produced today.

Although it included many of today's basic features, the machine lacked any drum suspension and therefore had to be anchored to the floor to prevent "walking". Because of the components required, the machine was also very expensive. For instance, the Bendix Home Laundry Service Manual (published November 1, 1946) shows that the drum speed change was facilitated by a 2-speed gearbox built to a heavy-duty standard (not unlike a car automatic gearbox, albeit at a smaller size). The timer was also probably fairly costly because miniature electric motors were expensive to produce.

Early automatic washing machines were usually connected to a water supply via temporary slip-on connectors to sink taps. Later, permanent connections to both the hot and cold water supplies became the norm, as dedicated laundry water hookups became common. Most modern front-loading European machines now only have a cold water connection (called "cold fill") and rely completely on internal electric heaters to raise the water temperature.

Many of the early automatic machines had coin-in-the-slot facilities and were installed in the basement laundry rooms of apartment houses.

World War II and after 

After the attack on Pearl Harbor, US domestic washer production was suspended for the duration of World War II in favor of manufacturing war material. However, numerous US appliance manufacturers were permitted to undertake the research and development of washers during the war years. Many took the opportunity to develop automatic machines, realizing that these represented the future of the industry.

A large number of US manufacturers introduced competing automatic machines (mainly of the top-loading type) in the late 1940s and early 1950s. General Electric also introduced its first top-loading automatic model in 1947. This machine had many of the features that are incorporated into modern machines. Another early form of automatic washing machine manufactured by The Hoover Company used cartridges to program different wash cycles. This system, called the "Keymatic", used plastic cartridges with key-like slots and ridges around the edges. The cartridge was inserted into a slot on the machine and a mechanical reader operated the machine accordingly.

Several manufacturers produced semi-automatic machines, requiring the user to intervene at one or two points in the wash cycle. A common semi-automatic type (available from Hoover in the UK until at least the 1970s) included two tubs: one with an agitator or impeller for washing, plus another smaller tub for water extraction or centrifugal rinsing.

Since their introduction, automatic washing machines have relied on electromechanical timers to sequence the washing and extraction process. Electromechanical timers consist of a series of cams on a common shaft driven by a small electric motor via a reduction gearbox. At the appropriate time in the wash cycle, each cam actuates a switch to engage or disengage a particular part of the machinery (for example, the drain pump motor). One of the first was invented in 1957 by Winston L. Shelton and Gresham N. Jennings, then both General Electric engineers. The device was granted US Patent 2870278.

On the early electromechanical timers, the motor ran at a constant speed throughout the wash cycle, although the user could truncate parts of the program by manually advancing the control dial. However, by the 1950s demand for greater flexibility in the wash cycle led to the introduction of more sophisticated electrical timers to supplement the electromechanical timer. These newer timers enabled greater variation in functions such as the wash time. With this arrangement, the electric timer motor is periodically switched off to permit the clothing to soak and is only re-energized just before a micro-switch being engaged or disengaged for the next stage of the process. Fully electronic timers did not become widespread until decades later.

Despite the high cost of automatic washers, manufacturers had difficulty meeting the demand. Although there were material shortages during the Korean War, by 1953 automatic washing machine sales in the US exceeded those of wringer-type electric machines.

In the UK and most of Europe, electric washing machines did not become popular until the 1950s. This was largely because of the economic impact of World War II on the consumer market, which did not properly recover until the late 1950s. The early electric washers were single-tub, wringer-type machines, as fully automatic washing machines, were extremely expensive. During the 1960s, twin tub machines briefly became very popular, helped by the low price of the Rolls Razor washers. Twin tub washing machines have two tubs, one larger than the other. The smaller tub in reality is a spinning drum for centrifugal drying while the larger tub only has an agitator in its bottom. Some machines could pump used wash water into a separate tub for temporary storage and to later pump it back for re-use. This was done not to save water or soap, but because heated water was expensive and time-consuming to produce. Automatic washing machines did not become dominant in the UK until well into the 1970s and by then were almost exclusively of the front-loader design.

In early automatic washing machines, any changes in impeller/drum speed were achieved by mechanical means or by a rheostat on the motor power supply. However, since the 1970s electronic control of motor speed has become a common feature on the more expensive models.

Cost-cutting and contemporary development 

Over time manufacturers of automatic washers have gone to great lengths to reduce costs. For instance, expensive gearboxes are no longer required, since motor speed can be controlled electronically. Some models can be controlled via WiFi, and have angled drums to facilitate loading.

Even on some expensive washers, the outer drum of front-loading machines is often (but not always) made of plastic (it can also be made out of metal but this is expensive). This makes changing the main bearings difficult, as the plastic drum usually cannot be separated into two halves to enable the inner drum to be removed to gain access to the bearing.

Many residential front-loading washing machines typically have a  concrete block to dampen vibration. Alternatives include a plastic counterweight that can be filled with water after delivery, reducing or controlling motor speeds, using hydraulic suspensions instead of spring suspensions, and having freely moving steel balls or liquid contained inside a ring mounted on both the top and bottom of the drum to counter the weight of the clothes and reduce vibration.

Most newer machines now use a brushless DC (BLDC) motor directly connected to the basket (direct drive), where the stator assembly is attached to the rear of the outer plastic drum assembly, whilst the co-axial rotor is mounted on the shaft of the inner drum. The BLDC motor eliminates the need for a pulley, belt and belt tensioner. It was first introduced to washing machines by Fisher and Paykel in 1991, with Patent No. 20150207371 granted in the US in 2011. Since then, other manufacturers have followed suit. Some washing machines with this type of motor now come with 10-year warranties. The motor type used is an outrunner, due to its slim design with variable speed and high torque. The rotor is connected to the inner tub through its center. It can be made out of metal or plastic.

Additional features 
The modern washing machine market has seen several innovations and features. For example:
 Some other washing machines include water jets (also known as water sprays and water showers) and steam nozzles that claim to sanitize clothes and help reduce washing times and remove soil from the clothes. Water jets get their water from the bottom of the drum, thus recirculating the water in the washer. 
 Others have special drums with holes that will fill with water from the bottom of the tub and redeposit the water on top of the clothes. Some drums have elements with the shape of waves, pyramids, hexagons, or diamonds. 
 Some include titanium or ceramic heating elements that claim to eliminate calcium buildup in the element.
 Some high-end models have lights built into the washer itself to light up the drum, 
 Others have soap dispensers where the user fills a tank with detergent and softener and the washing machine automatically doses the detergent and softener and sometimes picks the most appropriate wash cycle. In some models, the tanks come pre-filled and are installed and replaced with new tanks, also pre-filled or refilled by the user, in a dedicated compartment on the bottom of the machine. The Lightning One machine uses a pod cartridge to allow easy soap refills.
 Some have support for single-use capsules containing enough laundry additives for one load. The capsules are installed in the detergent compartment. 
 Many dilute the detergent before it comes in contact with the clothes, some by means of mixing the soap and water with air to make foam, which is then introduced into the drum. 
 Some have pulsators that are mounted on a plate on the bottom of the drum instead of an agitator. The plate spins, and the pulsators generate waves that help shake the soil out of the clothes. Many also include mechanisms to prevent or remove undissolved detergent residue on the detergent dispenser. 
 Some manufacturers like LG Electronics and Samsung Electronics have introduced functions on their washers that allow users to troubleshoot common problems with their washers without having to contact technical support. LG's approach involves a phone receiving signals through sound tones, while Samsung's approach involves having the user take a photo of the washer's time display with a phone. In both methods, the problem and steps to resolve it are displayed on the phone itself. Some models are also NFC enabled. Some implementations are patented under US Patent US20050268669A1 and US Patent US20050097927A1.

In the early 1990s, upmarket machines incorporated microcontrollers for the timing process. These proved reliable and cost-effective, so many cheaper machines now also incorporate microcontrollers rather than electromechanical timers. Since the 2010s, some machines have had touchscreen displays, full-color or color displays, or touch-sensitive control panels.

In 1994, Staber Industries released the System 2000 washing machine, which is the only top-loading, horizontal-axis washer to be manufactured in the United States. The hexagonal tub spins like a front-loading machine, using only about one-third as much water as conventional top-loaders. This factor has led to an Energy Star rating for its high efficiency.

In 1998, New Zealand-based company Fisher & Paykel introduced its SmartDrive washing machine line in the US. This washing machine uses a computer-controlled system to determine certain factors such as load size and automatically adjusts the wash cycle to match. It also used a mixed system of washing, first with the "Eco-Active" wash, using a low level of recirculated water being sprayed on the load followed by a more traditional style wash. The SmartDrive also included direct drive brushless DC electric motor, which simplified the bowl and agitator drive by doing away with the need for a gearbox system.

In 2000, the British inventor James Dyson launched the CR01 ContraRotator, a type of washing machine with two cylinders rotating in opposite directions. It was claimed that this design reduced the wash time and produced cleaner washing than a single-cylinder machine. In 2004 there was the launch of the CR02, which was the first washing machine to gain the British Allergy Foundation Seal of Approval. However, neither of the ContraRotator machines is now in production as they were too expensive to manufacture. They were discontinued in 2005. It is patented under U.S. Patent US7750531B2, U.S. Patent US6311527, U.S. Patent US20010023513, U.S. Patent US6311527B1, U.S. Patent USD450164.

In 2001, Whirlpool Corporation introduced the Calypso, the first vertical-axis high-efficiency washing machine to be top-loading. A washplate in the bottom of the tub nutated (a special wobbling motion) to bounce, shake, and toss the laundry around. Simultaneously, water containing detergent was sprayed onto the laundry. The machine proved to be good at cleaning but gained a bad reputation due to frequent breakdowns and destruction of laundry. The washer was recalled with a class-action lawsuit and pulled off the market.

In 2003, Maytag introduced their top-loading Neptune washer. Instead of an agitator, the machine had two washplates, perpendicular to each other and at a 45-degree angle from the bottom of the tub. The machine would fill with only a small amount of water and the two wash plates would spin, tumbling the load within it, mimicking the action of a front-loading washer in a vertical-axis design.

In 2006, Sanyo introduced the "world-first" (as of February 2, 2006, with regards to home use drum-type washer/dryer) drum-type washing machine with "Air Wash" function (i.e.: using ozone as a disinfectant). It also reused and disinfected rinse water. This washing machine uses only  of water in the recycle mode.

Approximately in 2012, eco-indicators were introduced, capable of predicting the energy demand based on the customer settings in terms of program and temperature.

Features available in most modern consumer washing machines:
 Delayed execution: a timer to delay the start of the laundry cycle
 Predefined programs for different laundry types
 Rotation speed settings
 Variable temperatures, including cold wash

Additionally, some modern machines feature:
 Child lock
 Steam
 Time remaining indication
 Extra water/rinse.

Around 2015 and 2017, some manufacturers (namely Samsung and LG Electronics) offered washers and dryers that either have a top-loading washer and dryer built on top of a front-loading washer and dryer respectively (in Samsung washers and dryers) or offer users an optional top-loading washer that can be installed under a washer or dryer (for LG washers and dryers) Both manufacturers have also introduced front-loading washers allowing users to add items after a wash cycle has started, and Samsung has also introduced top-loading washers with a built-in sink and a detergent dispenser that claims to leave no residue on the dispenser itself. In IFA 2017, Samsung released the QDrive, a front-loading washer similar to the Dyson ContraRotator but instead of two counter-rotating drums, the QDrive has a single drum with a counter-rotating impeller mounted on the back of the drum. Samsung claims this technique reduces cycle times by half and energy consumption by 20%.

Types

Top-loading

The top-loading, vertical-axis washer is the dominant design in the United States and Canada. This design places the clothes in a vertically mounted perforated basket that is contained within a water-retaining tub, with a finned water-pumping agitator in the center of the bottom of the basket. Clothes are loaded through the top of the machine, which is usually but not always covered with a hinged door.

Agitation

During the wash cycle, the outer tub is filled with water sufficient to fully immerse and suspend the clothing freely in the basket. The movement of the agitator pushes water outward between the paddles towards the edge of the tub. The water then moves outward, up the sides of the basket, towards the center, and then down towards the agitator to repeat the process, in a circulation pattern similar to the shape of a torus. The agitator direction is periodically reversed because continuous motion in one direction would just lead to the water spinning around the basket with the agitator rather than the water being pumped in the torus-shaped motion. Some washers supplement the water-pumping action of the agitator with a large rotating screw on the shaft above the agitator, to help move water downwards in the center of the basket.

Since the agitator and the drum are separate and distinct in a top-loading washing machine, the mechanism of a top-loader is inherently more complicated than a front-loading machine. Manufacturers have devised several ways to control the motion of the agitator during the wash and rinse separately from the high-speed rotation of the drum required for the spin cycle. While a top-loading washing machine could use a universal motor or DC brushless motor, it is conventional for top-loading washing machines to use more expensive, heavy, and more electrically efficient and reliable induction motors.

An alternative to the oscillating agitator design is the impeller-type washtub pioneered by Hoover on its long-running Hoovermatic series of top-loading machines. Here, an impeller (trademarked by Hoover as a "Pulsator") mounted on the side of the tub spins in a constant direction and creates a fast-moving current of water in the tub which drags the clothes through the water along a toroidal path. The impeller design has the advantage of its mechanical simplicity – a single-speed motor with belt drive is all that is required to drive the Pulsator with no need for gearboxes or complex electrical controls, but has the disadvantage of lower load capacity in relation to tub size. Hoovermatic machines were made mostly in twin-tub format for the European market (where they competed with Hotpoint's Supermatic line which used the oscillating agitator design) until the early 1990s. Some industrial garment testing machines still use the Hoover wash action.

The many different ways different manufacturers have solved the same problem over the years is a good example of many different ways to solve the same engineering problem with different goals, different manufacturing capabilities and expertise, and different patent encumbrances.

Reversible motor
In most current top-loading washers, if the motor spins in one direction, the gearbox drives the agitator; if the motor spins the other way, the gearbox locks the agitator and spins the basket and agitator together. Similarly, if the pump motor rotates one way it recirculates the sudsy water; in the other direction it pumps water from the machine during the spin cycle. Mechanically, this system is very simple.

Mode-changing transmission
In some top-loaders, the motor runs only in one direction. During agitation, the transmission converts the rotation into the alternating motion driving the agitator. During the spin cycle, the timer turns on a solenoid which engages a clutch locking the motor's rotation to the wash basket, providing a spin cycle. General Electric's very popular line of Filter-Flo (seen to the right) used a variant of this design where the motor reversed only to pump water out of the machine. The same clutch which allows the heavy tub full of wet clothes to "slip" as it comes up to the motor's speed, is also allowed to "slip" during agitation to engage a Gentle Cycle for delicate clothes.

Whirlpool (Kenmore) created a popular design demonstrating the complex mechanisms which could be used to produce different motions from a single motor with the so-called "wig wag" mechanism, which was used for decades until modern controls rendered it obsolete. In the Whirlpool mechanism, a protruding moving piece oscillates in time with the agitation motion. Two solenoids are mounted to this protruding moving piece, with wires attaching them to the timer. During the cycle, the motor operates continuously, and the solenoids on the "wig wag" engage in agitation or spin. Despite the wires controlling the solenoids being subject to abrasion and broken connections due to their constant motion and the solenoids operating in a damp environment where corrosion could damage them, these machines were surprisingly reliable.

Reversible motor with mode-changing transmission

Some top-loaders, especially compact apartment-sized washers, use a hybrid mechanism. The motor reverses direction every few seconds, often with a pause between direction changes, to perform the agitation. The spin cycle is accomplished by engaging a clutch in the transmission. A separate motorized pump is generally used to drain this style of machine. These machines could easily be implemented with universal motors or more modern DC brushless motors, but older ones tend to use a capacitor-start induction motor with a pause between reversals of agitation.

Top-load advantages

The top-loaders spin cycle between washing and rinsing allows an extremely simple passive fabric softener dispenser, which operates through centrifugal force and gravity. Fabric softener, vinegar, or any other liquid rinse agent, is placed in a cup at the top of the agitator. It "rides along" during the wash cycle. When the spin cycle is engaged, the fabric softener is pulled up by a tapered cup and centrifugal force, where it collects at the top of the spinning agitator. Once the spin cycle is completed, centrifugal force no longer suspends the fabric softener and it falls through the center of the agitator to join the rinse water coming into the tub. The same objective must be accomplished by a solenoid valve or a pump, and associated timer controls and wiring, on a front loader.

A lint trap can also be built into the center of the agitator, or on the drum's walls, passively collecting lint from water forced through the agitator. Front loaders tend to require separate pumps and plumbing to provide lint filters which are often mounted behind covers on the bottom of the machine.

Another advantage to the top-loading design is the reliance on gravity to contain the water, rather than potentially trouble-prone or short-lived front door seals. Top-loaders may require less periodic maintenance since there is no need to clean a door seal or bellows, although a plastic tub may still require a periodic "maintenance wash" cycle (described below).

Although wet fabric usually fits into a smaller space than dry fabric, a dense wad of fabric can restrict water circulation, resulting in poor soap distribution and incomplete rinsing. Extremely overloaded top-loading washers can either jam the motion of the agitator, overloading or damaging the motor or gearbox, burning drive belts, or tearing fabrics – many Whirlpool/Kenmore machines even have a mechanical "fuse" designed to break before the expensive motor is damaged. Extreme overloading can also push fabrics into the small gap between the underside of the agitator and the bottom of the wash basket, resulting in fabrics wrapped around the agitator shaft, possibly requiring agitator removal to unjam.

Some top-loading machines use mechanisms very similar to front-loading drum machines and are described below.

Front-loading

The front-loading or horizontal-axis clothes washer is the dominant design in Europe. In other regions of the world, most "high-end" washing machines are of this type. In addition, most commercial and industrial clothes washers around the world are of the horizontal-axis design.

This layout mounts the inner basket and outer tub horizontally, and loading is through a door at the front of the machine. The door often but not always contains a transparent window. Agitation is supplied by the back-and-forth rotation of the cylinder and by gravity. The clothes are lifted by paddles on the inside wall of the drum and then dropped. This motion flexes the weave of the fabric and forces water and detergent solution through the clothes load. Because the wash action does not require the clothing to be freely suspended in water, only enough water is needed to moisten the fabric. Because less water is required, front-loaders typically use less soap, and the repeated dropping and folding action of the tumbling can easily produce large amounts of foam or suds.

Front-loaders control water usage through the surface tension of water, and the capillary wicking action this creates in the fabric weave. A front-loader washer always fills to the same low water level, but a large pile of dry clothing standing in water will soak up the moisture, causing the water level to drop. The washer then refills to maintain the original water level. Because it takes time for this water absorption to occur with a motionless pile of fabric, nearly all front-loaders begin the washing process by slowly tumbling the clothing under the stream of water entering and filling the drum, to rapidly saturate the clothes with water.

Compared to top-loading washers, clothing can be packed more tightly in a front loader, up to the full drum volume if using a cotton wash cycle. This is because wet cloth usually fits into a smaller space than dry cloth, and front-loaders can self-regulate the water needed to achieve correct washing and rinsing. Extreme overloading of front-loading washers pushes fabrics towards the small gap between the loading door and the front of the wash basket, potentially resulting in fabrics lost between the basket and outer tub, and in severe cases, tearing of clothing and jamming the motion of the basket.

Mechanical aspects

Front-loading washers are mechanically simple compared to top-loaders, with the main motor (a universal motor or variable-frequency drive motor) normally being connected to the drum via a grooved pulley belt and large pulley wheel, without the need for a gearbox, clutch or crank. The action of a front-loading washing machine is better suited to a motor capable of reversing direction with every reversal of the wash basket; a universal motor is noisier, less efficient, and does not last as long, but is better suited to the task of reversing direction every few seconds. Some models, such as those by LG, utilize a motor directly connected to the drum, eliminating the need for a belt and pulley. But front-load washers suffer from their own technical problems, due to the drum lying sideways. For example, a top-loading washer keeps water inside the tub merely through the force of gravity pulling down on the water, while a front-loader must tightly seal the door shut with a gasket to prevent water dripping onto the floor during the wash cycle. This access door is locked shut with an interlocking device during the entire wash cycle since opening the door with the machine in use could result in water gushing out onto the floor. If this interlock is broken for any reason, such a machine stops operation, even if this failure happened mid-cycle. In most machines, the interlock is usually doubly redundant to prevent either opening with the drum full of water or being opened during the spin cycle. For front-loaders without viewing windows on the door, it is possible to accidentally pinch the fabric between the door and the drum, resulting in tearing and damage to the pinched clothing during tumbling and spinning.

Nearly all front-loader washers for the consumer market also use a folded flexible bellows assembly around the door opening, to keep clothing contained inside the basket during the tumbling wash cycle. If this bellows assembly was not used, small articles of clothing such as socks could slip out of the wash basket near the door, and fall down the narrow slot between the outer tub and basket, plugging the drain and possibly jamming rotation of the inner basket. Retrieving lost items from between the outer tub and inner basket can require complete disassembly of the front of the washer and pulling out the entire inner wash basket. Commercial and industrial front-loaders used by businesses (described below) usually do not use the bellows, and instead, require all small objects to be placed in a mesh bag to prevent loss near the basket opening.

Weak spots

The bellows assembly around the door is a potential source of problems for the consumer front-loader. The bellows have a large number of flexible folds to permit the tub to move separately from the door during the high-speed extraction cycle. On many machines, these folds can collect lint, dirt, and moisture, resulting in mold and mildew growth, and a foul odor. Some front-loading washer operating instructions say the bellows should be wiped down monthly with a strong bleach solution, while others offer a special "freshening" cycle where the machine is run empty with a strong dosing of bleach.

The inherent mechanical weak spot of the front loader design is the cantilevered mounting of the inner drum within the outer tub. The drum bearing has to support the entire weight of the drum, the laundry, and the dynamic loads created by the sloshing of the water and the imbalance of the load during the spin cycle. A broken seal can also let water into the bearing. The drum bearing eventually wears out and usually requires the extensive dismantling of the machine to replace, which often results in the machine being written off due to the failure of a relatively inexpensive component that is labor-intensive to renew. Some manufacturers have compounded this problem by "over-molding" the drum bearing into the outer tub to reduce manufacturing costs, but this makes the bearing impossible to renew without replacing the entire outer tub – which usually forces owners to scrap the entire machine – this may be viewed as an implementation of built-in obsolescence.

The spider arm, hidden behind the stainless steel drum, is unlike it usually made of uncoated aluminum alloy. It corrodes after being exposed to detergents and can fail after a few years.

Variant and hybrid designs

There are many variations of the two general designs. Top-loading machines in Asia use impellers instead of agitators. Impellers are similar to agitators except that they do not have the center post extending up in the middle of the washtub basket.

Horizontal-axis top-loader

Some machines which load from the top are otherwise much more similar to front-loading horizontal-axis drum machines. They have a drum rotating around a horizontal axis, as a front-loader, but there is no front door; instead, there is a liftable lid that provides access to the drum, which has a hatch that can be latched shut. Clothes are loaded, the hatch and lid are closed, and the machine operates and spins just like a front loader. These machines are narrower but usually taller than front-loaders, usually have a lower capacity, and are intended for use where only a narrow space is available, as is sometimes the case in Europe. They have incidental advantages: they can be loaded while standing (but force the user to bend down instead of crouching down or sitting to unload); they do not require a perishable rubber bellows seal; and instead of the drum having a single bearing on one side, it has a pair of symmetrical bearings, one on each side, avoiding asymmetrical bearing loading and potentially increasing life.

Washer dryer
There are also combo washer dryer machines that combine washing cycles and a full drying cycle in the same drum, eliminating the need to transfer wet clothes from a washer to a dryer machine. In principle, these machines are convenient for overnight cleaning (the combined cycle is considerably longer), but the effective capacity for cleaning larger batches of laundry is drastically reduced. The drying process tends to use much more energy than using two separate devices because a combo washer dryer not only must dry the clothing, but also needs to dry out the wash chamber itself.

These machines are used more where space is at a premium, such as areas of Europe and Japan because they can be fit into small spaces, perform both washing and drying, and many can be operated without dedicated utility connections. In these machines, the washer and dryer functions often have different capacities, with the dryer usually having the lowest capacity.

These machines should not be confused with a dryer on top of a washer installation, or with a laundry center, which is a one-piece appliance offering a compromise between a washer-dryer combo and a full washer to the side of the dryer installation or a dryer on top of a washer installation. Laundry centers usually have the dryer on top of the washer, with the controls for both machines being on a single control panel. Often, the controls are simpler than the controls on a washer-dryer combo or a dedicated washer and dryer. Some implementations are patented under US Patent US6343492B1 and US Patent US 6363756B1.

Comparison
True front-loaders, and top-loading machines with horizontal-axis drums as described above, can be compared with top-loaders on several aspects:

 Efficient cleaning: Front loaders usually use less energy, water, and detergent compared to the best top-loaders. High-efficiency washers use 20% to 60% of the detergent, water, and energy of standard" washers. They usually take somewhat longer (20–110 minutes) to wash a load, but are often computer controlled with additional sensors, to adapt the wash cycle to the needs of each load.
 Water usage: Front-loaders usually use less water than top-loading residential clothes washers. Estimates are that front-loaders use from one-third  to one half as much water as top-loaders.
 Spin-dry effectiveness: Front-loaders (and European horizontal-axis top-loaders and some front-loaders) offer much higher maximum spin speeds of up to 2000 RPM, although home machines tend to be in 1000 to 1400  RPM range, while top-loaders (with agitators) do not exceed 1140  RPM. High-efficiency top-loaders with a wash plate (instead of an agitator) can spin up to 1100 RPM, as their center of gravity is lower. Higher spin speeds, along with the diameter of the drum, determine the g-force, and a higher g-force removes more residual water, making clothes dry faster. This also reduces energy consumption if clothes are dried in a clothes dryer.
 Cycle length: Top-loaders have tended to have shorter cycle times, in part because their design has traditionally emphasized simplicity and speed of operation more than resource conservation. It is observed that top-loaders wash the clothes in half the time as compared to a front-load washing machine.
 Wear and abrasion: Top-loaders require an agitator or impeller mechanism to force enough water through clothes to clean them effectively, which greatly increases mechanical wear and tear on fabrics. Front-loaders use paddles in the drum to repeatedly pick up and drop clothes into the water for cleaning; this gentler action causes less wear and tear. The number of clothes wear can be roughly gauged by the amount of accumulation in a clothes dryer lint filter, since the lint largely consists of stray fibers detached from textiles during washing and drying.
 Difficult items: Top-loaders may have trouble cleaning large items, such as sleeping bags or pillows, which tend to float on top of the wash water rather than circulate within it. In addition, vigorous top-loader agitator motions may damage delicate fabrics. Whereas in a front-load washing machine, one can easily wash pillows, shoes, soft toys, and other difficult-to-wash items.
 Noise: Front-loaders tend to operate more quietly than top-loaders because the door seal helps contain noise, and because there is less of a tendency to imbalance. Top loaders usually need a mechanical transmission (due to agitators, see above), which can generate more noise than the rubber belt or direct drive found in most front-loaders.
 Compactness: True front-loading machines may be installed underneath counter-height work surfaces. A front-loading washing machine, in a fully fitted kitchen, may even be disguised as a kitchen cabinet. These models can also be convenient in homes with limited floor area, since the clothes dryer may be installed directly above the washer ("stacked" configuration).
 Water leakage: Top-loading machines are less prone to leakage because simple gravity can reliably keep water from spilling out the loading door on top. True front-loading machines require a flexible seal or gasket on the front door, and the front door must be locked during operation to prevent opening, lest large amounts of water spill out. This seal may leak and require replacement. However, many current front-loaders use so little water that they can be stopped mid-cycle for the addition or removal of laundry while keeping the water level in the horizontal tub below the door level. Best practice installations of either type of machine will include a floor drain or an overflow catch tray with a drain connection since neither design is immune to leakage or a solenoid valve getting stuck in the open position.
 Maintenance and reliability: Top-loading washers are more tolerant of maintenance neglect, and may not need a regular "freshening" cycle to clean door seals and bellows. During the spin cycle, a top-loading tub is free to move about inside the cabinet of the machine, using only a lip around the top of the inner basket and outer tub to keep the spinning water and clothing from spraying out over the edge. Therefore, the potentially problematic door-sealing and door-locking mechanisms used by true front-loaders are not needed. On the other hand, top-loaders use mechanical gearboxes that are more vulnerable to wear than simpler front-load motor drives.
 Accessibility and ergonomics: Front-loaders are more convenient for shorter people and those with paraplegia, as the controls are front-mounted and the horizontal drum eliminates the need for standing or climbing. Risers, also referred to as pedestals, often with storage drawers underneath, can be used to raise the door of a true front-loader closer to the user's level.
 Initial cost: In countries where top-loaders are popular, front-loaders tend to be more expensive to buy than top-loaders, though their lower operating costs can ultimately lead to lower total cost of ownership, especially if energy, detergent, or water are expensive. On the other hand, in countries with a large front-loader user base, top-loaders are usually seen as alternatives and more expensive than basic off-brand front-loaders, although without many differences in total cost of ownership apart from design-originated ones. In addition, manufacturers have tended to include more advanced features such as internal water heating, automatic dirt sensors, and high-speed emptying on front loaders, although some of these features could be implemented on top loaders.

Wash cycles

The earliest washing machines simply carried out a washing action when loaded with clothes and soap, filled with hot water, and started. Over time machines became more and more automated, first with very complex electromechanical controllers, then fully electronic controllers; users put clothes into the machine, select a suitable program via a switch, start the machine, and come back to remove clean and slightly damp clothes at the end of the cycle. The controller starts and stops many different processes including pumps and valves to fill and empty the drum with water, heating, and rotating at different speeds, with different combinations of settings for different fabrics.

Longer wash cycles can allow greater water and energy efficiency (with less water to heat up). For a  load, from 2011 to 2021, the average Australian washing machine cycle (including rinsing and spinning) has lengthened from 99 to 144 minutes for front-loaders, and 55 to 59 minutes for top-loaders.

Washing
Many front-loading machines have internal electrical heating elements to heat the wash water, to near boiling if desired. The rate of the chemical cleaning action of the detergent and other laundry chemicals increases greatly with temperature, by the Arrhenius equation. Washing machines with internal heaters can use special detergents formulated to release different chemical ingredients at different temperatures, allowing different types of stains and soils to be cleaned from the clothes as the wash water is heated up by the electrical heater.

However, higher-temperature washing uses more energy, and many fabrics and elastics are damaged at higher temperatures. Temperatures exceeding  have the undesirable effect of deactivating the enzymes when using biological detergent.

Many machines are cold-fill, connected to cold water only, which they heat to operating temperature. Where water can be heated more cheaply or with less carbon dioxide emission than by electricity, a cold-fill operation is inefficient.

Front-loaders need to use low-sudsing detergents because the tumbling action of the drum folds air into the clothes load which can cause excessive suds and overflows. However, due to the efficient use of water and detergent, the suds issue with front-loaders can be controlled by simply using less detergent, without lessening cleaning action.

Rinsing
Washing machines perform several rinses after the main wash to remove most of the detergent. Modern washing machines use less water due to environmental concerns; however, this has led to the problem of poor rinsing on many washing machines on the market, which can be a problem to people who are sensitive to detergents. The Allergy UK website suggests re-running the rinse cycle, or rerunning the entire wash cycle without detergent.

In response to complaints, many washing machines allow the user to select additional rinse cycles, at the expense of higher water usage and longer cycle time. Bosch, for example, in its allergy wash program, incorporates an additional three-minute rinse cycle with water of at least  to rinse off detergent residues and any allergen.

Spin
Front-loading machines spin in multiple stages of their cycle: after main wash, after individual rinses, and the final high-speed spin. Some of those spins may be absent depending on the particular cycle.

Higher spin speeds, along with larger tub diameters, remove more water, leading to faster drying. On the other hand, the need for ironing can be reduced by not using the spin cycle in the washing machine.

If a heated clothes dryer is used after the wash and spin, energy use is reduced if more water has been removed from clothes. However, faster spinning can crease clothes more. Also, mechanical wear on bearings increases rapidly with rotational speed, reducing life. Early machines would spin at 300 rpm and, because of lack of any mechanical suspension, would often shake and vibrate.

In 1976, most front-loading washing machines spun at around 700 rpm, or less.

Nowadays, most machines spin at 1000-1600RPM. Most machines have variable speeds, ranging from 300-2000RPM depending on the machine.

Separate spin-driers, without washing functionality, are available for specialized applications. For example, a small high-speed centrifuge machine may be provided in locker rooms of communal swimming pools to allow wet swimsuits to be substantially dried to a slightly damp condition after daily use.

Maintenance wash
Many home washing machines use a plastic, rather than metal, outer shell to contain the wash water; residue can build up on the plastic tub over time. Some manufacturers advise users to perform a regular maintenance or "freshening" wash to clean the inside of the washing machine of any mold, bacteria, encrusted detergent, and unspecified dirt more effectively than with a normal wash.

A maintenance wash is performed without any laundry, on the hottest wash program if there is a heater, adding substances such as white vinegar, 100 grams of citric acid, a detergent with bleaching properties, or a proprietary washing machine cleaner. The first injection of water goes into the sump so the machine can be allowed to fill for about 30 seconds before adding cleaning substances.

Efficiency and standards
Capacity and cost are both considerations when purchasing a washing machine. All else being equal, a machine of higher capacity will cost more to buy, but will be more convenient if large amounts of laundry must be cleaned. Fewer runs of a machine of larger capacity may have lower running costs and better energy and water efficiency than frequent use of a smaller machine, particularly for large families. Running a large machine with small loads is wasteful.

For many years energy and water efficiency were not regulated, and little attention was paid to them. From the last part of the twentieth century increasing attention was paid to efficiency, with regulations enforcing some standards, and efficiency being a selling point, both to save on running costs and to reduce carbon dioxide emissions associated with energy generation, and waste of water.

As energy and water efficiency became regulated, they became a selling point; however, the effectiveness of rinsing was not regulated, and it did not directly become a selling point. Therefore, manufacturers tended to reduce the degree of rinsing after washing, saving water and motor energy. This had the side-effect of leaving more detergent residue in clothes. Insufficient rinsing can leave enough detergent in clothes to affect people with allergies or sensitivity.

Europe

Washing machines display an EU Energy Label with grades for energy efficiency, washing performance and spin efficiency. Grades for energy efficiency run from A+++ to D (best to worst), providing a simple method for judging running costs. Washing performance and spin efficiency are graded in the range A to G. However, all machines for sale must have washing performance A, such that manufacturers cannot compromise washing performance in order to improve the energy efficiency. This labeling has had the desired effect of driving customers toward more efficient washing machines and away from less efficient ones.

According to newer regulations, each washing machine is equipped with a waste water filter. There are two reasons for that. On one hand it has to be ensured that no hazardous chemical substances are disposed of improperly through the waste water channel; on the other hand it must also be ensured that in case of a backwards shear in the waste water channel that is possible in case of technical problems, the feces and other waste could not enter the washing machine.

United States
Top-loading and front-loading clothes washers are covered by a single federal standard regulating energy consumption. The old federal standard applicable until January 1, 2011, included no restriction on water consumption; washer manufacturers faced no legal restriction on how much unheated rinse water could be used. Energy consumption for clothes washers is quantified using the energy factor.

But after new mandatory federal standards were introduced, many US washers were manufactured to be more energy- and water-efficient than required by the federal standard, or even certified by the more stringent Energy Star standard. Manufacturers were found to be motivated to exceed mandatory standards by a program of direct-to-manufacturer tax credits.

In North America, the Energy Star program compares and lists energy efficient clothes washers. Certified Energy Star units can be compared by their Modified Energy Factor (MEF) and Water Factor (WF) coefficients.
 
The MEF states how many cubic feet (about 28.3 liters) of clothes are washed per kWh (kilowatt hour) and is closely related to the configuration of the washer (top-loading, front-loading), its spin speed and the temperatures and the amount of water used in the rinse and wash cycles.

Energy Star residential clothes washers have a MEF of at least 2.0 (the higher the better), but the best machines may reach 3.5. Energy Star washers have also a WF of less than 6.0 (the lower the better).

Commercial use

A commercial washing machine is intended for more frequent use than a consumer washing machine. Durability and functionality is more important than style; most commercial washers are bulky and heavy, often with more expensive stainless steel construction to minimize corrosion in a constantly moist environment. They are built with large easy-to-open service covers, and washers are designed not to require access to the underside for service. Often commercial washers are installed in long rows with a wide access passageway behind all the machines to allow maintenance without moving the heavy machines.

Laundromat machines
Many commercial washers are built for use by the general public, and are installed in publicly accessible laundromats or laundrettes, operated by money accepting devices or card readers. The features of a commercial laundromat washer are more limited than those of a consumer washer, usually offering just two or three basic wash programs and an option to choose wash cycle temperatures.

The common front-loading commercial washing machine also differs from consumer models in its expulsion of wash and rinse water. While the consumer models pump used washer water out, allowing the waste line to be located above the washer, front-loading commercial machines generally use only gravity to expel used water. A drain in the rear, at the bottom of the machine opens at the appointed time during the cycle and water flows out. This creates the need for a drainage trough behind machines, which leads to a filter and drain. The trough is usually part of a cement platform built for the purpose of raising the machines to a convenient height, and can be seen behind washers at most laundromats.

Most laundromat machines are horizontal-axis front-loading models, because of their lower operating costs (notably lower consumption of expensive hot water).

Industrial washers

By contrast, commercial washers for internal business operations (still often referred to as "washer/extractor" machines) may include features absent from domestic machines. Many commercial washers offer an option for automatic injection of five or more different chemical types, so that the operator does not have to deal with constantly measuring out soap products and fabric softeners for each load by hand. Instead, a precise metering system draws the detergents and wash additives directly from large liquid-chemical storage barrels and injects them as needed into the various wash and rinse cycles. Some computer-controlled commercial washers offer the operator control over the various wash and rinse cycles, allowing the operator to program custom washing cycles.

Most large-scale industrial washers are horizontal-axis machines, but may have front-, side-, or top-load doors.

An industrial washer can be mounted on heavy-duty shock absorbers and attached to a concrete floor, so that it can extract water from even the most severely out-of-balance and heavy wash loads. Noise and vibration is not as unacceptable as in a domestic machine. It may be mounted on hydraulic cylinders, permitting the entire washer to be lifted and tilted so that fabrics can be automatically dumped from the wash drum onto a conveyor belt once the cycle is complete. 
 
One special type of continuous-processing washer is known as the tunnel washer. This specialized high-capacity machine does not have a drum where everything being washed undergoes distinct wash and rinse cycles, but moves the laundry slowly and continuously through a long, large-diameter horizontal-axis rotating tube in the manner of an assembly line, with different processes at different positions.

Social impact

The historically laborious process of washing clothes (a task which often had a whole day set aside to perform) was at times described as 'woman's work'. The spread of the washing machine has been seen to be a force behind the improvement of women's position in society.

In 2009 the Italian newspaper L'Osservatore Romano published a Playboy article on International Women's Day arguing that the washing machine had done more for the liberation of women than the contraceptive pill and abortion rights. A study from Université de Montréal, Canada presented a similar point of view and added refrigerators. The following year, Swedish statistician Hans Rosling suggested that the positive effect the washing machine had on the liberation of women makes it "the greatest invention of the industrial revolution". It has been argued that washing machines are an example of labour-saving technology, which does not decrease employment because households can internalize the gains of the innovation. Historian Frances Finnegan credits the rise of this technology in helping undercut the economic viability of the Magdalene asylums in Ireland, later revealed to be inhumanly abusive prisons for women, by supplanting their laundry businesses and prompting the eventual closure of the institutions as a whole. Irish feminist Mary Frances McDonald has described washing machines as the single most life-changing invention for women.

Before the advent of the washing machine, laundry was done first at watercourses and then in public washhouses known as lavoirs. Camille Paglia and others argue that the washing machine led to a type of social isolation of women, as a communal activity became a solitary one.

In India, dhobis, a caste group specialized in washing clothes, are slowly adapting to modern technology, but even with access to washing machines, many still handwash garments as well. Since most modern homes are equipped with a washing machine, many Indians have dispensed with the services of the dhobiwallahs.

Environmental impact
Due to the increasing cost of repairs relative to the price of a washing machine, there has been a major increase in the number of defective washing machines being discarded, to the detriment of the environment. The cost of repair and the expected life of the machine may make the purchase of a new machine seem like the better option.

Different washing machine models vary widely in their use of water, detergent, and energy. The energy required for heating is large compared to that used by lighting, electric motors, and electronic devices. Because of their use of hot water, washing machines are among the largest consumers of energy in a typical modern home.

See also

 Centrifugation
 Laundry
 Clothes dryer
 Combo washer dryer
 Detergent
 Drying cabinet
 Energetic efficiency
 Home appliance
 Ironing
 Laundry detergent
 Laundry symbols
 Laundry-folding machine
 List of home appliances
 Major appliance
 Silver Nano
 Standpipe
 L'Increvable

References

External links

 Preservation and also exhibition of vintage washing machines
 Washing Machines at the Canada Science and Technology Museum
 Washing Machine Museum

1843 introductions
American inventions
Articles containing video clips
Centrifuges
Cleaning tools
English inventions
Home appliances
Home automation
Laundry washing equipment
19th-century inventions